Strointsi is a village in Vinnytsia Raion, Vinnytsia Oblast, Ukraine.

Villages in Vinnytsia Raion